Hematite Township is a civil township of Iron County in the U.S. state of Michigan.  As of the 2000 census, the township population was 352. The township is named for the masses of hematite iron ore in the rocks prevalent in the area.

Communities
Amasa is an unincorporated community within the township, situated on U.S. Highway 141 at  where it crosses the Hemlock River.  It was named for Amasa Stone of Cleveland, Ohio. The ZIP code is 49903.

Geography

Demographics
As of the census of 2000, there were 352 people, 163 households, and 96 families residing in the township.  The population density was 2.3 per square mile (0.9/km2).  There were 343 housing units at an average density of 2.2 per square mile (0.9/km2).  The racial makeup of the township was 96.02% White, 0.85% Native American, 0.57% Asian, 0.57% from other races, and 1.99% from two or more races. Hispanic or Latino of any race were 0.57% of the population. 36.4% were of Finnish, 10.2% Italian, 9.2% German, 7.1% Swedish and 5.4% Scottish ancestry according to Census 2000.

There were 163 households, out of which 25.8% had children under the age of 18 living with them, 46.0% were married couples living together, 7.4% had a female householder with no husband present, and 41.1% were non-families. 38.0% of all households were made up of individuals, and 16.0% had someone living alone who was 65 years of age or older.  The average household size was 2.16 and the average family size was 2.81.

In the township, 22.2% of the population was the age of 18, 7.4% from 18 to 24, 22.7% from 25 to 44, 28.7% from 45 to 64, and 19.0% who were 65 years of age or older.  The median age was 42 years. For every 100 females, there were 101.1 males.  For every 100 females age 18 and over, there were 112.4 males.

The median income for a household in the township was $26,964, and the median income for a family was $31,607. Males had a median income of $29,000 versus $18,750 for females. The per capita income for the township was $13,931.  About 13.5% of families and 17.9% of the population were below the poverty line, including 32.4% of those under age 18 and 7.9% of those age 65 or over.

References

Townships in Iron County, Michigan
Townships in Michigan